The National Archaeological Museum (MAN) is a museum in Madrid, Spain. It is located on Calle de Serrano beside the Plaza de Colón, sharing its building with the National Library of Spain.

History 
The museum was founded in 1867 by a Royal Decree of Isabella II as a depository for numismatic, archaeological, ethnographical and decorative art collections of the Spanish monarchs. The establishment of the museum was predated by a previous unmaterialised proposal by the Royal Academy of History in 1830 to create a museum of antiquities.

The museum was originally located in the Embajadores district of Madrid. In 1895, it moved to a building designed specifically to house it, a neoclassical design by architect Francisco Jareño, built from 1866 to 1892. In 1968, renovation and extension works considerably increased its area. The museum closed for renovation in 2008 and reopened in April 2014.

Following a restructuring of the collection in the 1940s, its former pieces relative to the section of American Ethnography were transferred to the Museum of the Americas, while other pieces from abroad were destined to the National Museum of Ethnography and to the National Museum of Decorative Arts.

Its current collection is based on pieces from the Iberian Peninsula, from Prehistory to Early-Modern Age. However, it also has different collections coming from outside of Spain, especially from Ancient Greece, both from the metropolitan and, above all, from Magna Graecia, and, to a lesser extent, from Ancient Egypt, in addition to "a small number of pieces" from Near East.

Permanent exhibition

Forecourt 
In the forecourt is a replica of the Cave of Altamira from the 1960s. Photogrammetry was used to reproduce the famous paintings on a mould of the original cave. The replica cave is related to an exhibit at the Deutsches Museum in Munich.

Main building 
Visitors enter the building at basement level, and pass to the prehistory section.

Protohistory 
The halls devoted to the Protohistory of the Iberian Peninsula (1st floor) exhibit pieces from a number of Pre-Roman peoples existing roughly along the 1st millennia BC, as well as from the Punic-Phoenician colonisation. The former includes items from the Talaiotic culture, Iberian, Celtic, and Tartessian artifacts. The collection of Iberian sculpture from southern and southeastern Iberia is particularly notable, including  stone sculptures such as the iconic Lady of Elche, the Lady of Baza, the Lady of Galera, the Dama del Cerro de los Santos, the Bicha of Balazote, the Bull of Osuna, the Sphinx of Agost, one of the two  or the Mausoleum of Pozo Moro.

Aside from the set of Iberian sculpture, the area also hosts other items from different cultures, such as the Talaiotic bulls of Costitx, the torque of Ribadeo from the Castro culture in northwestern Iberia, or the Lady of Ibiza, associated to the Punic civilization.

Roman Hispania 
The collection of Hispano-Roman artifacts—located in the 1st floor—comes both from diggings at specific archaeological sites as well as from punctual purchases. The collection of Roman artifacts is completed by items from the personal collection of the Marquis of Salamanca (purchased in 1874 and comprising artifacts from the Paestum and Cales sites in the Italian Peninsula). The main room of the area is a courtyard, where the artifacts are placed creating a sort of forum-like arrangement. Meanwhile, the room #27 exhibits a number of mosaics both on its floor and walls. The collection of Hispano-Roman legal bronzes includes the Lex Ursonensis, comprising five pieces found in the 1870s in Osuna.

Late Antiquity 
The halls corresponding to the Late Antiquity (1st floor) host pieces related to the period of time corresponding to the Lower Roman Empire in the Iberian Peninsula—the Diocesis Hispaniarum (3rd–5th centuries AD)—, the Visigothic Kingdom of Toledo (6th-8th centuries AD), the Byzantine Empire (5th to 12th centuries AD), as well as some artifacts of other peoples from the Migration Period.

Medieval World, al-Andalus 
The area dedicated to al-Andalus is located in the 1st floor. A Jewish bilingual chapitel from Toledo is also exhibited.

Medieval World, Christian kingdoms 
The area dedicated to the medieval Christian Kingdoms (roughly ranging from the 8th to the 15th century) is located in the 2nd floor. It also displays a number of items of Levantine pottery.

Near East 
The topic area devoted to the Ancient Near East (conventionally excluding Ancient Egypt) is located at the 2nd floor. One of the most important sets of the MAN's Near East collection is that of pottery from Iran. The museum displays a diorite head from Mesopotamia donated to the Prado Museum in the 1940s by the Mexican collector Marius de Zayas (later deposited in the MAN). 21st century purchases include that of the  bought at Christie's in 2001.

Egypt and Nubia 
The collections of Egypt and Nubia are made up mainly of funerary funds (amulets, mummies, steles, sculpture of divinities, ushabti...) ranging from prehistory to Roman and medieval times. Many of the pieces come from purchases such as the one made from the collection of the Spanish Egyptologist Eduardo Toda y Güell and also from various excavations such as the ones carried in Egypt and Sudan as a result of the agreements with the Egyptian government for the construction of the Aswan Dam or the systematic excavations in Heracleopolis Magna.

Greece 

The Greek collection is made up of works from continental Greece, Ionia, Magna Graecia and Sicily, where the collection of bronzes, terracottas, goldsmiths, sculptures and to a greater extent pottery come from; pieces that ranging from the Mycenaean to the Hellenistic period. In its beginnings, the collection had funds from the Royal Cabinet of Natural History and the National Library, the collection was later enriched with works brought from the expeditions of the frigate Arapiles to the East in addition to the purchase of private funds such as those of the Marquis of Salamanca or those of Tomás Asensi.

Notable artifacts 
Prehistoric and Iberian
Lady of Elche
Lady of Baza
Lady of Galera
Dama del Cerro de los Santos
Biche of Balazote
Bull of Osuna
Magacela stele
Mausoleum of Pozo Moro
Sphinx of Agost
Roman
Bear of Porcuna
Lex Ursonensis
Medieval
Crucifix of Ferdinand and Sancha
Al-Andalus
Pyxis of Zamora
One of the Alhambra vases

See also 
 List of museums in Spain
 National Museum of Sculpture in Valladolid

References

External links 
National Archaeological Museum of Spain - Muselia
Official list of museums in Spain
National Archaeological Museum (Madrid) within Google Arts & Culture

Archaeological
Museums in Madrid
Archaeological museums in Spain
Museums established in 1867
Neoclassical architecture in Spain
Bien de Interés Cultural landmarks in Madrid
Caves of Spain
Replica caves
1867 establishments in Spain